William Crane may refer to:

William Crane (politician) (1785–1853), merchant, judge and legislator in New Brunswick
William Carey Crane, president of Baylor University
William M. Crane (1776–1846), officer in the United States Navy
William H. Crane (1845–1928), American actor
William Howe Crane (1854–1926), American lawyer
William Crane (musician) (?-1545), British musician

See also
William Crain (disambiguation)
Bill Crane (1924–2014), Australian rules footballer